Kenly may refer to:

Places 

Kenly, North Carolina, town in Johnston and Wilson counties, North Carolina, United States

People 

Frank Kenly, American football coach
John Reese Kenly (1818–1891), American lawyer and Civil War general
William L. Kenly, American World War I general